Elvis is a jukebox musical based upon the life of American singer Elvis Presley, conceived by and Ray Cooney (Producer and Co-Devisor) and Jack Good (Director and Co-devisor). It tells the story of Elvis's life and career, from the beginning until his death. The original cast included Shakin' Stevens, who later became the top-selling UK singles artist of the 1980s and Tracey Ullman.

Production history

1977 production
The original West End production opened on November 28, 1977, at the Astoria Theatre in London, which had been converted from a cinema especially for the show by Laurie Marsh. Elvis was portrayed by three performers: Tim Whitnall as Young Elvis, Shakin' Stevens as Middle Elvis in his army and movie star years and PJ Proby as Mature Elvis in his Las Vegas years. Proby was later replaced by Bogdan Kominowski. Live musical accompaniment was provided by the rock and roll revival group, Fumble. The production won the 1977 Evening Standard Theatre Award for Best Musical and played for 614 performances, closing in April 1979. (This can be confirmed by the fact that many of the cast went on to perform in the 1979, revival of Grease which previewed at the Bristol Hippodrome in May 1979). The show did a nine-month UK and Europe tour from December 1979, with full cast replacements except for Stevens and Kominowski, who briefly reprised their roles but were replaced during the tour by Bo Wills as Middle Elvis and Vince Eager as Mature Elvis. Touring commenced at the Pavilion Theatre, Bournemouth and concluded at the King's Theatre, Edinburgh. International stops included Gothenburg, Stockholm, Helsinki, Copenhagen, Oslo, Amsterdam and Den Bosch.

Production team
Producer and co-devisor - Ray Cooney
Director and co-devisor - Jack Good
Designer - Patrick Robertson
Lighting - David Hersey
Costumes - Rosemary Vercoe
Sound - Autograph
AV - Ray Millichope
Musical Director - Keith Strachan
Musical Supervisor and co-writer - Harry Robinson
Assistant director - Annabel Leventon
Choreographer - Carole Todd

Cast
PJ Proby (listed as James Proby in programme) - Older Elvis (later replaced by Bogdan Kominowski)
Bogdan Kominowski - Older Elvis
Shakin' Stevens - Middle Elvis
Tim Whitnall - Young Elvis
Helen Baker - Singer and Dancer
Tanith Banbury - Singer and Dancer
Anna Macleod - Singer and Dancer
Yael O'Dwyer - Singer and Dancer
Tracey Ullman - Dance Captain and Singer / Dancer
Richard Ashley - Singer and Dancer 
Paul Felber - Singer and Dancer
Stephen Leigh - Singer and Dancer
Richard Piper - Singer and Dancer
Shaun Simon - Singer and Dancer

Musicians
Keith Strachan (MD)
Sean Mayes
Mario Ferrari
Des Henly
Barry Pike
Ronnie Caryl
Bob Efford
Roy Truman
Paul Urwin
Mike Harding
Tony Hepworth
Mark Hutchins
Phil Todd

1996 production
In 1996, Bill Kenwright Ltd mounted a modified production at the Prince Of Wales Theatre, directed by Keith Strachan and Carole Todd. PJ Proby returned as Las Vegas Elvis, Tim Whitnall as mid-period Elvis, and Alexander Bar joined them as young Elvis. Various song changes were made to the initial 1977 production. After transferring to the Piccadilly Theatre in 1997, the show toured the UK until 2000.

Musical numbers
Tupelo Mississippi Flash
Blue Suede Shoes
Are You Lonesome Tonight?
Yesterday
A World Without Love
Mystery Train
Tiger Man
Loving You
I Want To Hold Your Hand
All Round The World
Six-Five Special
How Great Thou Art
King Creole
Dixieland Rock
Got A Lot O' Livin' To Do
Wear My Ring Around Your Neck
Ready Teddy
Let's Have a Party
Tryin' to Get to You
Too Much
Teddy Bear
Such a Night
Don't
Good Luck Charm
Return to Sender
Burning Love
My Baby Left Me
One Night
Treat Me Nice
Mean Woman Blues
Hound Dog
Jailhouse Rock
An American Trilogy

References

External links
Fumble Site devoted to the original house band.
Alexander Bar Site maintained by a star of the 1996 production, featuring clippings, photographs and promotional appearances.

1977 musicals
Jukebox musicals
West End musicals
British musicals
Rock musicals
Rockabilly
Cultural depictions of Elvis Presley